The Guess List is a British comedy game show that was broadcast on BBC One from 12 April to 24 May 2014. Presented by Rob Brydon, it features two contestants competing for a prize specially selected for them.

Production
The pilot episode was filmed on 23 August 2013 at MediaCityUK. The series was commissioned by Charlotte Moore, Mark Linsey and Alan Tyler and produced by 12 Yard.

Episode list

References

External links
 
 

2014 British television series debuts
2014 British television series endings
BBC television comedy
BBC television game shows
2010s British game shows
English-language television shows
Television series by ITV Studios
Television shows set in the United Kingdom